Umreth is a municipality (nagar palika) and administrative seat for Umreth Taluka in Anand district, Gujarat, India. As of 2001 it had a population of 32,191.

Notable People
 Dewang Mehta   - Former President of NASSCOM
 Ashok Bhatt    - Former Speaker of Gujarat Legislative Assembly 
 Yaswant Shukla     - Gujarati Writer 
 Harihar Khambholja  - Former Finance Minister of Gujarat

References

Anand district